The 1982 All-Ireland Minor Hurling Championship was the 52nd staging of the All-Ireland Minor Hurling Championship since its establishment by the Gaelic Athletic Association in 1928.

Kilkenny entered the championship as the defending champions, however, they were beaten by Galway in the All-Ireland semi-final.

On 5 September 1982 Tipperary won the championship following a 2-7 to 0-4 defeat of Galway in the All-Ireland final. This was their 15th All-Ireland title and their first in two championship seasons.

Results

Munster Minor Hurling Championship

First round

Semi-finals

Final

All-Ireland Minor Hurling Championship

Semi-final

Final

External links
 All-Ireland Minor Hurling Championship: Roll Of Honour

Minor
All-Ireland Minor Hurling Championship